Wilfried Puis (18 February 1943 in Ostend – 21 October 1981) was a Belgian football player.

He played for R.S.C. Anderlecht and the Belgium national football team. Puis was praised for his speed, agility and goal kicks which made him and Paul Van Himst a perfect match. A year after he ended his football career, he died of stomach cancer at the age of 38.

Club career
While playing for Anderlecht, he won the Belgian Golden Shoe in 1964. In November 1971, Puis moved to rival Club Brugge. After one season, he was transferred to Lokeren.

International career
Puis was in the Belgium-Netherlands match in 1964 with 10 teammates from Anderlecht after the substitution of goalkeeper Delhasse by Jean-Marie Trappeniers. In total, he played 49 times for the national team between 1962 and 1975, starting in the second half of a 1–3 friendly defeat to Italy on 13 May 1962. Puis played in all three group 1 stage games of the 1970 World Cup.

Honours

Player 
RSC Anderlecht

 Belgian First Division: 1961–62, 1963–64, 1964–65, 1965–66, 1966–67, 1967–68
 Belgian Cup: 1964–65
 Inter-Cities Fairs Cup runners-up: 1969–70

Club Brugge

 Jules Pappaert Cup: 1972

Individual 

 Belgian Golden Shoe: 1964 (winner), 1965 (2nd)
 Puis-Verbiest trophy (KV Oostende player of the season): from 2016

References

External links

 Profile & stats – Lokeren
 Stats – Club Brugge

1943 births
1981 deaths
Belgian footballers
Belgium international footballers
Belgian Pro League players
R.S.C. Anderlecht players
Club Brugge KV players
K.S.C. Lokeren Oost-Vlaanderen players
1970 FIFA World Cup players
Sportspeople from Ostend
Footballers from West Flanders
Association football forwards